Joseph Geoffrey Moock  (born March 12, 1944) is an American former professional baseball infielder who appeared in 13 games as a third baseman and pinch hitter in the Major Leagues for the New York Mets in .

Moock attended Louisiana State University and was selected in the third round of the initial June amateur draft, held in 1965. In his second pro season, 1966 with the Auburn Mets, Moock led the New York–Penn League in hits with 146. He spent most of the first five months of the 1967 campaign on the MLB Mets' military list, in force during the Vietnam War period. He made his debut with New York on September 1, and started ten games during the waning months of the 1967 season, collecting nine hits, including two doubles, and five runs batted in.

Returning to the minor leagues for more playing time in 1968, he was acquired by the expansion Montreal Expos in 1969, but was never recalled to the majors. Moock retired after the 1970 minor-league season.

After his pro baseball days were over, Moock was a baseball coach at a private school in Louisiana.

External links
Baseball Reference

1944 births
Living people
American expatriate baseball players in Canada
Auburn Mets players
Baseball coaches from Louisiana
Baseball players from Louisiana
Buffalo Bisons (minor league) players
LSU Tigers baseball players
Major League Baseball third basemen
Memphis Blues players
New York Mets players
People from Plaquemine, Louisiana
Raleigh-Durham Mets players
Savannah Senators players
Shreveport Braves players
West Palm Beach Expos players
Williamsport Mets players
Winnipeg Whips players